She-Ra and the Princesses of Power is an American animated streaming television series developed by ND Stevenson and produced by DreamWorks Animation Television. A reboot of the 1985 Filmation series She-Ra: Princess of Power, the 2018 series tells the tale of a teenager named Adora, who gains powers that allow her to turn into the titular heroine. Emboldened with this power, Adora leads a group of other magical princesses in an alliance to defeat the evil Hordak and his Horde. The series was first streamed by Netflix, with its first season debuting on November 13, 2018. The series' fifth and final season was released on May 15, 2020.

Series overview

Episodes

Season 1 (2018)

Season 2 (2019)

Season 3 (2019)

Season 4 (2019)

Season 5 (2020)

Shorts

"Swift Wind Adventures" (2019)

"Princess Rebel Recruitment" (2019)

Home media

DVD releases

References

External links
 Official website at DreamWorksTV
 Official website at Netflix
 

Lists of American children's animated television series episodes
2010s television-related lists